This list of V-Varen Nagasaki players comprises all players who have participated in at least one league match for V-Varen Nagasaki since the team's first J. League Division 2 season in 2013. Players who were in the squad but never played a first team game are not listed; players who appeared for the team in other competitions (such as the Emperor's Cup) but never actually made a J. League Division 2 appearance are noted at the bottom of the page.

A 
  Ryota Arimitsu

C 
  Oh Chang-Hyun

F 
  Michael Fitzgerald
  Daisuke Fujii
  Kenta Furube

H 
  Yoshinobu Harada

I 
  Yudai Inoue
  Yudai Iwama
  Fumiya Iwamaru

K 
  Sai Kanakubo
  Junki Kanayama
  Daisuke Kanzaki
  Kazuya Kawabata
  Shuto Kono

M 
  Yusuke Maeda
  Shota Matsuhashi
  Atsushi Matsuo
  Cho Min-Woo
  Shoma Mizunaga
  Shinsaku Mochidome

N 
  Satoshi Nakayama

O 
  Yusei Ogasawara
  Kazuya Okamura

S 
  Kōichi Satō
  Yukihiko Sato
  Kohei Shimoda
  Takuya Sugiyama

T 
  Ryota Takasugi

Y 
  Kohei Yamada
  Takahiro Yamaguchi

V-Varen Nagasaki